This is a list of French television related events from 2000.

Events
15 February - Sofia Mestari is selected to represent France at the 2000 Eurovision Song Contest with her song "On aura le ciel". She is selected to be the forty-third French Eurovision entry during a national final held at the Olympia in Paris.

Debuts

International
 Law & Order: Special Victims Unit (Unknown)

Television shows

1940s
Le Jour du Seigneur (1949–present)

1950s
Présence protestante (1955-)

1970s
30 millions d'amis (1976-2016)

1990s
Sous le soleil (1996-2008)

Ending this year
Cap des Pins (1998-2000)

Births

Deaths

See also
2000 in France